Friars Island is a small townland near Athlone, County Westmeath, Ireland. The townland stands to the north of Athlone town, on the shores of Killinure Lough. As of the 2011 census, the townland contained no houses and was unpopulated.

References 

Townlands of County Westmeath